Hunyadfalva is a small village in Jász-Nagykun-Szolnok county, in the Northern Great Plain region of central Hungary.

Geography

Population
It has a population of 230 people (2002).

Populated places in Jász-Nagykun-Szolnok County